Nam Yimyaem is a retired judge of the Supreme Court of Thailand, former deputy Supreme Court President, and currently chairperson of a committee investigating the assets of deposed Thai Prime Minister Thaksin Shinawatra.

April 2006 election
In the April 2006 legislative election, Nam was chair of an Election Commission subcommittee investigating claims that Thai Rak Thai party executive Thammarak Israngukra na Ayuthaya hired smaller parties to contest the election.

Election commission
Nam was nominated as a candidate for Election Commissioner after a court jailed the previous set of Commissioners.  As part of the scrutiny process, Nam declared that he and his spouse had 66 million Baht in net assets.  The Senate ultimately did not choose him.

Post-2006 coup asset examination committee
Nam was appointed by the military junta that overthrew the government of Thaksin Shinawatra to chair a committee to investigate the former government.  Nam will replace Sawat Chotepanich, who resigned after an original committee was dissolved after disagreements about scope.  The revised scope of the committee was broad, and included tax evasion, and could focus not only on members of the Thaksin government but also on civil servants.  Members of the committee included Jaruvan Maintaka, Kaewsan Atibhoti, and Sak Korsaengruang.

References

Living people
Nam Yimyaem
Year of birth missing (living people)